An office lady, often abbreviated OL, is a female office worker in Japan who performs generally pink-collar tasks such as secretarial or clerical work. Office ladies are usually full-time permanent staff, although the jobs they perform usually have relatively little opportunity for promotion, and there is usually the tacit expectation that they leave their jobs once they get married.

Due to some Japanese pop culture influence in Mainland China, Taiwan and Hong Kong, the term is also in common usage there. However, the meaning of the word is slightly different. The term is also sometimes seen in Anglophone countries.

History
The rise in OLs began after World War II, as offices expanded. They were first known as "BGs" (for "Business Girls"), but it was later found that English-speakers used a similar acronym, B-girls, to refer to "bargirls". Josei Jishin, a women's magazine, ran a competition to find a better name for the business girls. OL was chosen in 1963 from the entries.

In the 1980s, being an OL was the most common job for Japanese women, and OLs made up approximately one-third of the female work force.

According to Miyako Inoue, The Equal Employment Opportunity Law (EEOL) was enacted in 1986, and phased into implementation. The EEOL creates avenues for women employees to seek legal recourse for unfair workplace treatment or sexual harassment. Although the EEOL had virtually no effect in changing discriminatory business practices, it was promoted nationally by the government."

OL stock characters are frequently found in josei manga and anime, often portrayed as attractive, clever, and wistful individuals bored with their jobs, over-pressured by their families, and facing psychological issues.

Sex discrimination 
Especially in the late 20th century, OLs were often depicted as passive and submissive because they did not seem to care about strong sex discrimination against them in the workplace. Many OLs were well educated, yet they were still treated as low-skilled clerical workers, and the fact that OLs were usually responsible for serving tea to office leaders and male employees in the workplace indicates the existence of sexual discrimination against OLs in major Japanese corporations.

OLs were expected to leave the company after they married. The employers, therefore, are reluctant to spend extra money to train OLs.

However, many OLs are content with their position and wages in the company because a great number of them live with their parents and do not have to worry about their daily expenses. Thus, they can spend all their salaries on travelling or luxury goods.

Employment 
The Japanese female labor force participation rate has been increasing since 1960. In 1995, almost 40 percent of people in the labor force were women. The age patterns of employed males and females differed vastly. 75 percent of females in their early twenties are employed, and the percentage drops significantly after they reach their late twenties and early thirties, when most of them get married and start raising a family. (The percentage dropped to 55 percent for females in their early thirties.) There is also a tendency for women older than 34 to return to the labor force in a part-time job, which makes the labor force participation rate increase for females after their mid thirties. Males, on the other hand, are attached continuously to the labor market after they get a job in their early twenties. Therefore, the labor force participation rate for males remains high (95%) in their 30s, 40s and early 50s.

It is noteworthy that almost one third of all female employees in 1995 had clerical jobs; most of them were OLs. But the proportion is much smaller for males: only 15 percent of all employed males had clerical jobs. Although many women work in offices, they still have many fewer opportunities for promotion than males. Only 1% of female employees are managers or officials; in contrast, this figure is almost one-seventh for males.

Hierarchy structure and tension 
In Japanese companies, tenure is crucial: it determines not only employees' wages but also their positions in the company. Employees with shorter tenure have to show respect to those with longer tenure.

The word doki is used to describe the relationship between those who enter the company in the same year or have the same length of tenure. If two employees are doki, they are assumed to have equal position. Similarly, senpai (one's senior) and kohai (one's junior) are also commonly used to show the hierarchy in Japanese companies.

A junior female employee has to use polite terms such as desu and masu when she speaks to her senpai. Senpai, on the other hand, can speak casually with their kohai.

If tenure is the only standard that determines one's position in the group as well as in the company, everything will be straightforward. However, the difference in education that OLs receive causes tension between them. OLs who are college graduates may have higher official ranks than those who are high school graduates, even if the latter have longer tenure.

Sometimes, due to the difference in their education, a kohai may have a higher official rank, as well as wage, than their senpai. As a result, the kohai is unwilling to be deferential to their senpai, while the senpai feels it unfair that they receive lower pay. If OLs do not get along with each other in the workplace, they cannot unite together to fight against gender discrimination.

See also
Salaryman
Kyariaūman
Women in Japan

References

Further reading

Female stock characters in anime and manga
Japanese business terms
Society of Japan
Women in Japan
Employment in Japan
Lady
Wasei-eigo
Gendered occupations